Benoit Maubrey is an often exhibited contemporary American artist born in 1952. While Maubrey falls under the technical title of a sculptor, he labels himself as the creator of "electroacoustic sculptures." These sculptures combine both three-dimensional  work and sound in different variations of performance and sculpture. he has made contributions to the fields of dance, sculpture, sound, and technology by combining all three in his "Audio Ballerinas." The  "Audio Ballerinas" are particularly important because not only do they eliminate the distinct separation between the performer and the audience by the stage, they also allow the dancers to create the music and dance at the same time. This is vastly different from percussion dance groups, such as the popular group STOMP, because they create a new auditory and visual language in the art world. Currently, Maubrey is the director of a traveling Berlin-based art group called DIE AUDIOd GUPPE.

Sculptures 
There are three main categories that Maubrey's sculptures fall under. The first one is a gate/wall/structure built of speakers. The second reimagines everyday objects being replaced by speakers and the third has sculptures emitting sound.

Performances

The Evolution of the Audio Ballerinas 
Maubrey's wearable acoustic systems started back in 1982 when he bought some second-hand clothing and attached loudspeakers, amplifiers, batteries and walkmans to these clothes. A few years later in 1989, the electronic tutu first emerged when he started playing around with solar panels. A dancer friend of his visited his studio and remarked on how similar it looked to a tutu.

The first rendition of the tutus operated on solar panels and created sound based on the professional dancer's movement and the surrounding light available in the environment. This allowed for music production and dance to be created as one unit instead of two separate things. Traditionally, western dance would be performed on a stage and the music in the pit by either a symphony or orchestra. The music would be conceived and written first and then, the dance on stage would be choreographed. Around Maubrey's time the same was true even of street performance artists. The music would already be in existence and the dancer would react to it. Here, both occur simultaneously. Not only that but, the dance is what makes the music and the traditional order is flipped.

The next addition involved the use of metal rakes that would scrape along the ground and being attached to sensors would create different sounds based on pressure, texture of surfaces, and speed. This not only allows for the dancers to create the music but also the environment. So, no longer is the performance separated from the things surrounding it but instead, exists in the then and there and cannot be exactly replicated.

Then, Maubrey took it step further. Now, the dancers themselves created, dictated, and controlled what sound was being made, instead of the light or the environment. The black bands on her arms and torso are sensors that react and make certain sounds based on movements. The dancer has to learn the specific movements and the associated sounds and thus, focuses more on the creation of music instead of just the movement with sound being the side effect. This allows the dancer to not only captivate the visual but also the auditory component.

Another aspect to allowing the dancers control over making and mixing the music on spot is making sound visualized. One does not see a vibrating pulsing line most associated with computer programs that let us see the audio line. Instead, a specific visual language is created with not only movement but also sound. This is different from other performance groups that seek to make music and dance at the same time such as the popular group known as STOMP.

The difference between the two, is that STOMP uses a visual and auditory language that already exists. A person stomps their foot, a loud thump is made. A person hits a trashcan with a drumstick, an almost snare like effect is created. Their focus is less on dance and more on the music. They simply replace traditional instruments with common objects and focus on percussion which is closely linked to already existing tribal dances.

A further separation between STOMP and Maubrey's tutus can be seen in the next generation of the tutu which not only includes movement based sensors but also samplers and microphones. This allows for the audience and the environment to create auditory input and for the dancer to record it, replay it, and to change it with dance and a mixing device. Thus, the dancer has the option to create music and then react to it or to do the two simultaneously. Allowing their movements to do the mixing. This includes other instrument, as seen here, the human voice, environmental sounds, etc. Thus, increasing audience involvement and possible participation further removing the distinction between the audience and stage.

The removal of this distinction also affects the dancers authorship. With audience involvement and the environmental factors it becomes less of a solo performance and more of a collaboration. Some of these collaborators are conscious of being involved but, due to the sensitivity of the microphones, passersby become unknowingly part of the show by either their footsteps, their car, even a clearing of a throat.

The final real change that occurred in the electronic tutus before they evolved into another form completely was the inclusion of the radio receivers. These receivers were powered by solar panels, going back towards Maubrey's original ideas, and these receivers picked up radio waves by the way that the dancers positioned their bodies in sunlight. These solar panels were attached to the dancer's head and arms. The difference between this edition of the solar powered tutu and the first rendition of it is that by using radio waves, the dancer could pick up actual radio stations and white noise. Thus, the environment is not the only collaborator with the dancer but instead, the light itself, when partnered with radio waves, becomes a dance partner that the dancer has to react to and work with.

These audio ballerinas break through the barriers between music and dance, performance and audience, and technology and tradition. A perfect example of mixing technology and tradition can be seen in the next evolution of sound clothes, the audio geisha. Created in 1997, the audio geishas include light sensors on the kimono and the dancers hands, movement sensors, a small portable guitar amplifier, microphones, infrared sensors, and radio receivers.

The geishas created music similarly to the audio ballerinas but, they also used traditional instruments often associated with their dances. Another additional detail is that the audio ballerinas were also incorporated in the performance.

In all, Maubrey's sound tutus and geishas seek to redefine the relationship between the auditory, visual, and performative arts with the use of developing technology in order to break down barriers.

History of Exhibitions and Performances 

Maubrey has exhibited several times a year since 1985 in mostly the Western world.

Awards 
Honorary Mention in the 1991 Prix Ars Electronicia.

European Award for Street Theatre/Holzminden in 1995.

Grand Prix International Video Danse in 2002.

Palmarès du 35e Concours Internationaux de Musique et d’Art Sonore Electroacoustiques de Bourges in 2004 and 2009.

Franklin Furnace Fund for Performance NYC in 2006.

Marler Video Installations Prize in 2008.

Sound Art Grant from the City of Berlin 2016

Works Citied 

1952 births
American artists
Living people